George Ashburnham, Viscount St Asaph (9 October 1785 – 7 June 1813), styled The Honourable George Ashburnham until 1812, was a British politician.

Background and education
Ashburnham was the eldest son of George Ashburnham, 3rd Earl of Ashburnham, and Sophia, daughter of Thomas Thynne, 1st Marquess of Bath. He gained the courtesy title Viscount St Asaph when his father succeeded in the earldom in 1812. He was educated at Trinity College, Cambridge, graduating MA in 1805.

Political career
Ashburnham was returned to Parliament for New Romney in 1807, a seat he held until 1812, and then represented Weobley (succeeding his uncle Lord George Thynne) until his death in 1813.

Personal life
Lord St Asaph died unmarried at Dover Street, London, in June 1813, aged only 27.  His half-brother Bertram Ashburnham eventually succeeded in the earldom.

References

External links 
 

1785 births
1813 deaths
Heirs apparent who never acceded
Alumni of Trinity College, Cambridge
Members of the Parliament of the United Kingdom for English constituencies
UK MPs 1807–1812
UK MPs 1812–1818
British courtesy viscounts